Ponghwasan Sports Club  is a North Korean organization of physical education specialty with several departments. Football is the most popular department in this organization.The name ponghwasan is a mountain in Unsan County.

References

Football clubs in North Korea